Micrommata aljibica is a spider species found in Spain.

See also 
 List of Sparassidae species

References

External links 

Sparassidae
Spiders of Europe
Fauna of Spain
Spiders described in 2004